Bahamonde Point is a headland which marks the western extremity of the Schmidt Peninsula on Trinity Peninsula. The point was charted by the Chilean Antarctic Expedition (1947–48) and named for First Lieutenant Arturo Bahamonde Calderon, engineer of the expedition.

References
 

Headlands of Trinity Peninsula